Sporting Clube de Portugal Feminino is a Portuguese women's football team from Lisbon. It is the women's section of Sporting Clube de Portugal.
The team won the national championship and the Portuguese Women's Cup in 2016–17 and 2017–18.

History
Sporting had a women's team in the 1990s. Then for 21 years there was no women's football. The club reactivated the team for the 2016–17 season and immediately won the national championship and cup, qualifying for the UEFA Women's Champions League for the first time.

Competitive Record

Players

Current squad

Former players

References

External links
 Sporting Clube de Portugal's website
 Sporting Clube de Portugal on zeroazero

Women's football clubs in Portugal
Sporting CP sports
Sport in Lisbon